Le Havre City Hall is the seat of local government in Le Havre, Normandy, France. In 2017, it was classed as a monument historique by the French state.

It was designed by Auguste Perret and construction began in 1953. Perret died shortly afterwards and Jacques Tournant took over until completion in 1958. Perret was tasked with rebuilding the city after its destruction in World War II. Using concrete, the city was rebuilt in a homogenous manner from 1945 to 1964. The city hall is 143 metres in length, and its 18-storey tower is 70 metres high. Perret's redesigned city has been a UNESCO World Heritage Site since 2005.

Its design was initially controversial, as some voices in the city council wanted a reconstruction of the destroyed city hall which dated from 1859. It was built on the same spot. The tower drew the strongest criticism, as such skyscrapers were considered American and not French.

References

City and town halls in France
Monuments historiques of Seine-Maritime
Buildings and structures completed in 1958
Modernist architecture in France
City hall
20th-century architecture in France